Jared Tristan Padalecki (born July 19, 1982) is an American actor.  He is best known for playing the role of Sam Winchester in the TV series Supernatural. He grew up in Texas and rose to fame in the early 2000s after appearing on the television series Gilmore Girls as well as the films New York Minute (2004) and House of Wax (2005), later starring in Friday the 13th (2009).

Early life and education

Padalecki was born on July 19, 1982, in San Antonio, Texas, to Gerald and Sherri Padalecki. His father is of Polish descent, while his mother has German, Scottish, French, and English ancestry.

He was a 2000 candidate for the Presidential Scholars Program. In 1998, Padalecki and his partner Chris Cardenas won the National Forensic League national championship in Duo Interpretation. Although he had originally planned to attend the University of Texas after graduating from high school in 2000, Jared decided to move Los Angeles County, California instead to pursue an acting career.

Career

Padalecki won Fox Broadcasting's 1999 "Claim to Fame Contest"; he subsequently appeared at the Teen Choice Awards, where he met an agent. His first role was a minor role in the 1999 film A Little Inside. In 2000, he was cast as Dean Forester on the television series Gilmore Girls, a role he played until 2005. Throughout the early 2000s, he appeared in several made-for-television films, including Silent Witness, Close to Home, and the Disney Channel Original Movie A Ring of Endless Light.

Padalecki had an uncredited role as a high school bully in 2003's comedy Cheaper by the Dozen, which he played after being asked by fellow actor and friend Tom Welling, who played Charlie Baker, and the director of the movie, who wanted someone larger than Charlie to pick on him. Padalecki originally auditioned for Welling's role, but gave it up in order to film a pilot titled Young MacGyver which was never picked up.

In 2004, he appeared in the Mary-Kate and Ashley Olsen comedy New York Minute as Trey Lipton, a cute boy to whom the Olsens' characters are attracted. He also landed a short role in the thriller Flight of the Phoenix alongside Dennis Quaid and Hugh Laurie. In 2005, Padalecki starred opposite Elisha Cuthbert, Chad Michael Murray, and Paris Hilton in House of Wax as Wade. In 2005, he appeared in Cry Wolf, another horror film, as Tom.

Also in 2005, Padalecki was cast as Sam Winchester on the WB series, Supernatural. Sam and his brother Dean (Jensen Ackles) drive throughout the United States hunting paranormal predators, fighting demons and angels, and dealing with all manner of fantasy & sci-fi genre. The show ended in 2020, after fifteen seasons, making it the longest-running North American sci-fi series in history.

In 2007, Jared served as the host of MTV's horror reality series, Room 401, which was discontinued after only eight episodes due to poor ratings.

He had the lead role in 2008's Christmas Cottage as Thomas Kinkade, alongside acclaimed actor Peter O'Toole.

He also had the lead role in the 2009 version of Friday the 13th as Clay Miller, a character who heads out to Camp Crystal Lake in search of his sister who has gone missing.

In September 2019, Padalecki was announced as the titular role in Walker, a reboot series of Walker, Texas Ranger in development at The CW. The reboot was ordered to series in January 2020 and premiered in January 2021.

Personal life
Padalecki's engagement to his Supernatural co-star Genevieve Cortese was announced in January 2010. They met when Cortese guest starred as Ruby on the show's fourth season. Padalecki proposed to her in front of their favorite painting, Joan of Arc, by French realist Jules Bastien-Lepage at New York's Metropolitan Museum of Art in October 2009. The pair married on February 27, 2010, in Cortese's hometown of Sun Valley, Idaho. On October 10, 2011, the couple announced that they were expecting their first child together. Their son was born on March 19, 2012. On December 22, 2013, Cortese gave birth to their second son. Their daughter was born on March 17, 2017. The couple resides in Austin, Texas with their three children.

Padalecki and Supernatural co-stars Jensen Ackles and Misha Collins supported Beto O'Rourke for the 2018 Senate election in Texas.

Always Keep Fighting
In March 2015, Padalecki launched his Always Keep Fighting campaign through Represent.com. His first campaign raised funds for To Write Love On Her Arms, which supports people struggling with depression, addiction, self-injury, and suicide. The cause is particularly close to Padalecki, who has been candid about his own struggles with depression. For the second campaign in the Always Keep Fighting series in April 2015, Padalecki partnered with co-star Jensen Ackles to release a shirt featuring both of their faces, to benefit their newly formed joint charitable fund. Over 70,000 shirts were sold. Later, Padalecki launched a third campaign selling a further 40,000 shirts.

During San Diego Comic-Con 2015, more than 6,000 fans surprised Padalecki at the Supernatural panel by holding up candles for him, after having revealed his battle with depression earlier in the year.

Filmography

Film

Television

Awards and nominations

References

External links

 
 
 Interview with Jared Padalecki at SuicideGirls.com

1982 births
Living people
20th-century American male actors
21st-century American male actors
Male actors from San Antonio
Male actors from Texas
American expatriates in Canada
American male film actors
American people of Polish descent
American male television actors
American male voice actors
American people of German descent
American people of Scottish descent
American people of French descent
American people of English descent